Chad Kultgen (born June 16, 1976) is an American novelist, journalist, and podcaster. He has published the novel "How to Win the Bachelor" with podcasting co-host Lizzy Pace, along with several online pieces, including an opinion article in The Huffington Post. Kultgen was a staff writer for Hits and the Weekly World News, and his works have been reviewed by Maxim, Penthouse, and The New York Times. He has several writing and production credits, including The Incredible Burt Wonderstone, a 2013 film starring Steve Carell.

Some critics have said that his male protagonists are misogynistic and trite. Kultgen says he "get[s] at least a few Facebook messages every week from someone who has come across the book and enjoyed it. I also get messages from people who didn't enjoy the book. They tend to be a bit irate and usually take the time to tell me that I'm the worst living writer, the world would be a better place without me, I have no understanding of women or all of my books should be burned. So I guess I'd say the reaction to the first book was ... strong on both sides."
A New York Times piece in 2011 interviewed people who asserted that characters in his works were based on them.

His 2011 book, Men, Women, and Children was released as a feature film in 2014, featuring Adam Sandler, Emma Thompson, Ansel Elgort, and Jennifer Garner. It received poor critical and commercial success, netting only 2.2 million dollars at the box office.

Works
The Average American Male (2007)
The Lie (2009)
Men, Women, and Children (2011)
The Average American Marriage (2013)
Darklight (2014)
Strange Animals (2015)
How to Win the Bachelor  (2021)
Dudesy  (2022)

Film credits
Inguenue (1999, Animator)
Sing Along Songs: Brother Bear - On My Way (2003, associate producer)
Disney Princess Stories Volume Two: Tales of Friendship (2005, associate producer)
Disney Princess Stories Volume Three: Beauty Shines from Within (2005, associate producer)
Ranger Bios (2007, writer)
Ranger Arsenal (2007, writer)
Ranger Vehicles (2007, writer)
Waiting to Die (2009, writer, executive producer)
Southern Discomfort (2010, writer)
The Incredible Burt Wonderstone (2013, writer, actor)
Men, Women, and Children (2014)
Bad Judge (2015, writer, executive producer)

References

1976 births
Living people
American male writers
Obscenity controversies in literature